Andrea Maria Erba (1 January 1930 – 21 May 2016) was a Roman Catholic bishop.

Born in 1930, he was ordained to the priesthood for Barnabite Order in 1956, Erba served as bishop of the Roman Catholic Diocese of Velletri-Segni, Italy, from 1989 until 2008.

References

1930 births
2016 deaths
20th-century Italian Roman Catholic bishops
Barnabites
Barnabite bishops
People from the Province of Monza e Brianza
21st-century Italian Roman Catholic bishops